The New York Innovative Theatre Awards (also known as NYIT Awards and IT Awards) are accolades given annually by the New York Innovative Theatre Foundation, a not-for-profit arts organization founded in 2004, to honor individuals and organizations who have achieved artistic excellence in off-off-Broadway theatre.

Mission statement

The New York Innovative Theatre Foundation was created to bring recognition to the great work being done in New York City's Off-Off-Broadway, to honor its artistic heritage, and to provide a meeting ground for this extensive community. The organization advocates for Off-Off-Broadway and recognizes the unique and essential role it plays in contributing to American and global culture. We believe that publicly recognizing excellence in Off-Off-Broadway will expand audience awareness and appreciation of the full New York theatre experience.

The IT Awards is a not-for-profit arts organization supporting the Off-Off-Broadway community by:

 Celebrating and Recognizing extraordinary Off-Off-Broadway Theatre
 Strengthening the community and collective identity of Off-Off-Broadway
 Honoring the artistic heritage of Off-Off-Broadway
 Advancing public interest in and understanding of Off-Off-Broadway and the theatrical arts in general

IT Foundation Personnel

This organization was founded in 2004 by Jason Bowcutt, Shay Gines and Nick Micozzi.

STAFF: Shay Gines, Executive Director; Nick Micozzi, Executive Director; Akia, Company Manager; Christopher Borg, Communications & Outreach; Hillary Cohen, Judge Wrangler; Desmond Dutcher, Judge Coordinator; Doug Strassler, Update Editor; Morgan Lindsay Tachco, Community Services Manager; Katie Rosin, Public Relations

BOARD OF DIRECTORS: Jason Bowcutt, Roman Feeser, Shay Gines, Benjamin Hodges, Bob Lee, Roger LeFevre, Leone Rendon de Litt, Nick Micozzi, Linda S. Nelson

ALUMNI STAFF/BOARD: Michael Michell, Board President; Tim Pinckney, Board Member; Nancy Kim, Members Coordinator; Emily Sandack, Update Editor

Judging System

The awards are selected based on a peer evaluation system that includes adjudication from 3 assigned Off-Off-Broadway artists as well as the average of audience votes.

The judging system is a direct result of the endeavour to provide opportunities for artists to see each other's work and create a venue for them to become familiar with other Off-Off-Broadway companies and artists, some of which they might otherwise never know.

In 2008 a video was created to detail this process and can be viewed on YouTube.

Additional programs

The IT Awards authored a book entitled Producing Off-Off-Broadway which will be published by United Stages in 2007.

2011 IT Awards Recipients

The 2011 New York Innovative Theatre Awards were held on Monday, September 19 at Cooper Union's Great Hall in New York City and was attended by 800 artists and their guests. The event was hosted by comedian Harrison Greenbaum, directed by Tom Wojtunik and a presentation by the Flux Theatre Ensemble.  Presenters included Susan Stroman, Jay O. Sanders, David Henry Hwang, John Glover, Shirley Knight, and John Patrick Shanley.

2009 IT Awards Recipients

 The 2009 New York Innovative Theatre Awards were held on Monday, September 21 at New World Stages in New York City and was attended by 750 artists and their guests. The event was hosted by Julie Halston with script contributions by Matthew Freeman, opening number performed by Scott Williams and directed by Christopher Borg and a presentation by The Brick Theater Company.

 HONORARY AWARDS

The 2009 Artistic Achievement Award for significant artistic contribution to the Off-Off-Broadway community was presented by Nilo Cruz to Maria Irene Fornes.

The 2009 Stewardship Award for significant contribution to the Off-Off-Broadway community through service, support and leadership was presented by Commissioner of Cultural Affairs Kate D. Levin to Harriet Taub and Materials for the Arts.

The 2009 Caffe Cino Fellowship Award for consistent production of outstanding work, was presented by Ben Hodges and Jeff Riebe to The Brick Theater.

 PRODUCTION AWARDS

 Full web broadcast of the ceremony with blog commentary by Aaron Riccio.
 Podcast of backstage interviews with the presenters and recipients by Michael Gilboe on Broadway Bullet
 List of all of the artists and companies that were nominated for the 2009 awards

2008 IT Awards Recipients
The 2008 New York Innovative Theatre Awards were held on Monday, September 22 at the Fashion Institute of Technology's Haft Auditorium in New York City and was attended by 750 artists and their guests. The event was hosted by Lisa Kron with performances by the Blue Man Group and a presentation by Boomerang Theatre Company's Jennifer Larkin, Joe Whelski and Vinnie Penna.

 HONORARY AWARDS

The 2008 Artistic Achievement Award for significant artistic contribution to the Off-Off-Broadway community was presented by Olympia Dukakis to Judith Malina.

The 2008 Stewardship Award for significant contribution to the Off-Off-Broadway community through service, support and leadership was presented by Kirk Wood Bromley to the New York Theatre Experience- Martin Denton and Rochelle Denton.

The 2008 Caffe Cino Fellowship Award for consistent production of outstanding work, was presented by Leonard Jacobs and Akia to Boomerang Theatre Company.

 PRODUCTION AWARDS

 Podcast of interviews with the presenters and nominees on Broadway Bullet
 Honorary Award Recipients article by Doug Strassler
 List of all of the artists and companies that were nominated for the 2008 awards

2007 IT Awards Recipients
The 2007 New York Innovative Theatre Awards were held on Monday, September 24 at the Fashion Institute of Technology's Haft Auditorium in New York City and was attended by 750 artists and their guests. The event was hosted by Julie Halston with a presentation by Rising Phoenix Repertory's Elizabeth West.

 HONORARY AWARDS

The 2007 Artistic Achievement Award for significant artistic contribution to the Off-Off-Broadway community was presented by Mark Finley to Doric Wilson.

The 2007 Stewardship Award for significant contribution to the Off-Off-Broadway community through service, support and leadership was presented by Christine Quinn to Alliance of Resident Theatres/New York (A.R.T./New York).

The 2007 Caffe Cino Fellowship Award for consistent production of outstanding work, was presented by Leonard Jacobs and Paul Adams to Rising Phoenix Repertory.

 PRODUCTION AWARDS

2006 IT Awards Recipients

The 2006 New York Innovative Theatre Awards were held on Monday, September 18 at the historic Cooper Union in New York City and was attended by 600 artists and their guests. The event was hosted by Charles Busch with a special presentation by Lisa Stevenson of ART/NY.

 HONORARY AWARDS

The 2006 Artistic Achievement Award for significant artistic contribution to the Off-Off-Broadway community was presented by Ben Vereen to Tom O'Horgan.

The 2006 Stewardship Award for significant contribution to the Off-Off-Broadway community through service, support and leadership was presented by William Russo and Tim Errickson to The Field.

The 2006 Caffe Cino Fellowship Award for consistent production of outstanding work includes a grant to be used toward an Off-Off-Broadway production, was presented by Leonard Jacobs to The Vampire Cowboys Theatre Company

 PRODUCTION AWARDS

2005 IT Awards Recipients

The inaugural awards ceremony was held on Monday, September 19 at the Lucille Lortel Theatre and was attend by 300 nominees and guests. It was hosted by Charles Busch with a special presentation by Judith Haking and the opening number was performed by the cast of [title of show], Hunter Bell, Jeff Bowen, Susan Blackwell, Heidi Blickenstaff and Larry Pressgrove.

 HONORARY AWARDS

The 2005 Artistic Achievement Award for significant artistic contribution to the Off-Off-Broadway community was presented by Leonard Jacobs to Basil Twist.

The 2005 Stewardship Award for significant contribution to the Off-Off-Broadway community through service, support and leadership was presented by Tom O'Horgan to Ellen Stewart.

The 2005 Caffe Cino Fellowship Award for consistent production of outstanding work includes a grant to be used toward an Off-Off-Broadway production, was presented by Leonard Jacobs and Jeff Riebe to Inverse Theatre Company.

 PRODUCTION AWARDS

References

External links
 

American theater awards